Back Creek is a small rural locality in the Queanbeyan–Palerang Regional Council, part of the Southern Tablelands region of New South Wales, Australia.

References

Queanbeyan–Palerang Regional Council
Southern Tablelands
Localities in New South Wales